African-American Georgians are residents of the U.S. state of Georgia who are of African American ancestry. As of the 2010 U.S. Census, African Americans were 31.2% of the state's population. Georgia has the second largest African American population in the United States following Texas. Georgia also has a Gullah community. African slaves were brought to Georgia during the slave trade.

History

Spanish colonists brought African slaves to Georgia in 1526. African slaves imported to Georgia primarily came from Angola, Sierra Leone, and the Gambia. Slaves mostly worked on cotton and rice plantations. By the mid-19th century the majority of white people in Georgia, like most White Southerners, had come to view slavery as economically indispensable to their society. Georgia, with the largest number plantations of any state in the Southern United States, had in many respects come to epitomize plantation culture. When the American Civil War started in 1861, most white people in the South joined in the defense of the Confederate States of America (Confederacy), which the state Georgia had helped to create.

In 1912, White people drove out every black resident in Forsyth County.

Beginning in the 1890s, Georgia passed a wide variety of Jim Crow laws that mandated racial segregation and racial separation for white people in public facilities and effectively codified the region's tradition of white supremacy. Lynching African Americans was also common in Georgia. White mobs would lynch black men.

Georgia became a slave state in 1751. Initially,  Georgia was the only British colony in the United States to try to ban slavery.

Civil War

The Civil War happened in Georgia. African American soldiers fought the Civil War in Georgia.

Lynching

Many black men were lynched by white mobs in Georgia.

Historically black colleges and universities in Georgia

Georgia is the home of ten historically Black colleges and universities (HBCUs): Albany State University, Clark Atlanta University, Fort Valley State University, Interdenominational Theological Center, Morehouse College, Morehouse School of Medicine, Morris Brown College, Paine College, Savannah State University, and Spelman College.

Politics 
The historically Republican state of Georgia flipped blue in the 2020 Presidential Election and the 2021 U.S. Senate runoffs, in part, due to high Black voter turnout. Joe Biden won the black vote in Georgia in the 2020 exit poll with 88% of black Georgians voting for Biden.

Notable people

Civil Rights
 A.D. King (1930-1969)
 Bernice King (born 1963)
 Dexter King (born 1961)
 John Wesley Dobbs (1882-1961)
 Martin Luther King III (born 1957) 
 Martin Luther King Jr. (1929-1968), born and raised in Atlanta, attended Morehouse College and was the first president of the Southern Christian Leadership Conference, both based in the city.
 Martin Luther King Sr. (1899-1984) 
 Yolanda King (1955-2007)

Politics
 Clarence Thomas (born 1948)
 Raphael Warnock (born 1969), came to prominence for his activism as a pastor in Atlanta. Warnock is the first African American to represent Georgia in the Senate and the first Black Democrat to be elected to the Senate by a former state of the Confederacy.
 Stacey Abrams (born 1973), two-time Democratic candidate for governor was born in Madison, Wisconsin, but was raised in Gulfport, Mississippi. Moved with her family to Atlanta in 1989.

Music

 112, African American R&B band
 21 Savage (born 1992), originally claiming to be from Decatur, GA, the rapper was revealed to have been born in Newham, London after being detained by U.S. Immigration and Customs Enforcement (ICE) for overstaying his Visa. 
 André 3000 (born 1975)
 Big Boi (born 1975)
 Ciara (born 1985)
 Future (born 1983)
 Gladys Knight (born 1944)
 Gucci Mane (born 1980), moved to Atlanta from his birthplace in Bessemer, Alabama with his single mother at age 9. 
 James Brown (1933-2006)
 Jeezy (born 1977) 
 Kanye West (born 1977), born in Atlanta, moved to Chicago with his mother after his parent's divorce at age 3. 
 Kelly Rowland (born 1981), born in Atlanta, moved with family to Houston as a child, where she would go on to form a relationship with a young Beyoncé. 
 Keri Hilson (born 1982) 
 Lil Baby (born 1994)
 Lil Jon (born 1972)
 Lil Nas X (born 1999)
 Lil Yachty (born 1997)
 Little Richard (1932-2020)
 Ludacris (born 1977)
 Offset (rapper) (born 1991)
 Otis Redding (1941–67)
 Pastor Troy (born 1977)
 Playboi Carti (born 1996)
 Quavo (born 1991)
 Ray Charles (1930-2004)
 Soulja Boy (born 1990)
 T.I. (born 1980)
 Takeoff (rapper) (1994-2022)
 Usher (born 1978)
 Young Thug (born 1991)
 Bobby V (born 1980)
 Waka Flocka Flame (born 1986)
 CeeLo Green (born 1975)
 Yung Joc (born 1980)
 Lil Scrappy (born 1984)
 Rasheeda
 Quando Rondo (born 1999)
 Silentó

Sport
 Calvin Johnson (born 1985), retired NFL wide receiver. 
 Champ Bailey (born 1978), retired NFL cornerback.  
 Dwight Howard (born 1985), NBA center who is currently a free agent. 
 Herschel Walker (born 1962), Heisman trophy winner and Republican candidate for U.S. Senate in 2022.
 Jackie Robinson (1919-1972), born in Cairo, GA, but primarily raised in California. 
 Jim Brown (born 1936), born in St. Simon's Island, GA, moved to Long Island with his family at age 8. 
 Lou Williams (born 1986), NBA guard who is currently a free agent. 
 Rock Ya-Sin (born 1996), NFL cornerback for the Las Vegas Raiders.
 Sugar Ray Robinson (1921-1989)
 Thomas Davis Sr. (born 1983), retired NFL linebacker 
 Tyreek Hill (born 1994), NFL wide receiver for the Miami Dolphins. 
 Walt Frazier (born 1945)

Religious
 Wilton Gregory (born 1947), Catholic cardinal

Film and Television
 Chris Tucker (born 1971) 
 Donald Glover (born 1983), comedian, actor, rapper, writer, director, and producer who created the acclaimed comedy-drama Atlanta along with his brother Stephen.
 Raven-Symoné (born 1985)
 Spike Lee born 1957), born in Atlanta, moved with his family to Brooklyn during childhood. Returned to Atlanta to attend Morehouse College.

Writing
 Delores Phillips (1950-2014)
 Owen Dodson (1914-1983)
 Tayari Jones (born 1970)

See also

 African Americans in Alabama
 African Americans in Atlanta
 African Americans in Florida
 African Americans in North Carolina
 African Americans in South Carolina
 African Americans in Tennessee
 Black Southerners
 Demographics of Georgia (U.S. state)
 Gullah
 History of Georgia (U.S. state)
 History of slavery in Georgia (U.S. state)
 List of African-American historic places in Georgia
 List of African-American newspapers in Georgia
 White Americans in Georgia
 Hispanics and Latinos in Georgia

References

Further reading
 Bacote, Clarence A. "Some aspects of negro life in Georgia, 1880-1908." Journal of Negro History 43.3 (1958): 186–213. online
 Bacote, Clarence A. "Negro proscriptions, protests, and proposed solutions in Georgia, 1880-1908." Journal of Southern History 25.4 (1959): 471–498. online
 Bernd, Joseph L. "White supremacy and the disfranchisement of Blacks in Georgia, 1946." Georgia Historical Quarterly 66.4 (1982): 492–513. online
 Blassingame, John W. "Before the Ghetto: The Making of the Black Community in Savannah, Georgia, 1865-1880." Journal of Social History 6#4 (1973), pp. 463–88. ]online
 Dittmer, John. Black Georgia in the Progressive Era, 1900-1920 (University of Illinois Press, 1980).
 Drago, Edmund L. Black politicians and reconstruction in Georgia: A splendid failure (University of Georgia Press, 1992) online.
 Fischer, David Hackett. African Founders: How Enslaved People Expanded American Ideals (Simon & Schuster, 2022), ch 5. before 1860.
 Flynn Jr, Charles L. White land, Black labor: Caste and class in late nineteenth-century Georgia (LSU Press, 1999).
 Grant, Donald Lee. The way it was in the South: The Black experience in Georgia (University of Georgia Press, 2001).
 Grantham, Dewey W. "Georgia Politics and the Disfranchisement of the Negro." Georgia Historical Quarterly 32.1 (1948): 1-21. online
 Hornsby, Alton. "Black Public Education in Atlanta, Georgia, 1954-1973: From Segregation to Segregation." Journal of Negro History 76#1 (1991), pp. 21–47. online
 Inscoe, John C., ed. Georgia in Black and White: Explorations in Race Relations of a Southern State, 1865-1950 (University of Georgia Press, 2009).
 Jones, Jacqueline. Soldiers of light and love: Northern teachers and Georgia Blacks, 1865-1873 (University of Georgia Press, 1992) online.
 Meier, August, and David Lewis. "History of the Negro upper class in Atlanta, Georgia, 1890-1958." Journal of Negro Education 28.2 (1959): 128–139. online
 Matthews, John M. "Black Newspapermen and the Black Community in Georgia, 1890-1930." Georgia Historical Quarterly 68#3 (1984), pp. 356–81. online
 Range, Willard. The rise and progress of Negro colleges in Georgia, 1865-1949 (University of Georgia Press, 2009).
 Wood, Betty. Slavery In Colonial Georgia, 1730–1775 (2007) online
 Wood, Betty. Women's Work, Men's Work: The Informal Slave Economies of Lowcountry Georgia, 1750-1830 (1995) excerpt.

External links
African Americans in Georgia: A Reflection of Politics and Policy in the New South
 African Presence in Georgia
 Georgia African American History and Culture
 Georgia in Black and White: Explorations in Race Relations of a Southern State, 1865-1950
 Slavery in Colonial Georgia
 White Supremacy and the Disfranchisement of Blacks in Georgia, 1946
 Segregation - New Georgia Encyclopedia